Jocelyn Kelleher (born 17 February 2000) is an Australian rugby league footballer who plays as a  for the Sydney Roosters in the NRL Women's Premiership and the Central Coast Roosters in the NSWRL Women's Premiership.

Background
Born in Gosford, New South Wales, Kelleher played her junior rugby league for the Central Coast Roosters.

Playing career
In March 2020, Kelleher joined the Central Coast Roosters in the NSWRL Women's Premiership. On 27 September 2020, she started at second-row in their Grand Final win over the North Sydney Bears.

On 23 September 2020, she joined the Sydney Roosters NRL Women's Premiership team. In Round 1 of the 2020 NRL Women's season, she made her debut for the Roosters in an 18–4 win over the St George Illawarra Dragons. On 25 October 2020, she came off the bench in the Roosters Grand Final loss to the Brisbane Broncos.

References

External links
Sydney Roosters profile

2000 births
Living people
Australian female rugby league players
Rugby league second-rows
Sydney Roosters (NRLW) players